Otto Völker (2 March 1893 – 6 August 1945) was a German international footballer.

References

1893 births
1945 deaths
Association football midfielders
German footballers
Germany international footballers
BFC Preussen players